Bahmut is a commune in Călărași District, Moldova. It is composed of two villages, Bahmut and Bahmut station.

References

Communes of Călărași District